Sweat is the eighteenth studio album by the band Kool & the Gang, released in 1989 following a three-year gap between albums. James "J.T." Taylor, Khalis Bayyan and Robert "Spike" Mickens had departed, and this album showed a refocused band.

Singles
Both "Raindrops" (peak #27) and "Never Give Up" (peak #74) on the Billboard Hot Soul Songs chart.

Critical reception

Ron Wynn of Allmusic called the album "a completely faceless, aimless record…probably the worst album of their career,". Hugh Wyatt of the New York Daily News called Sweat "one of the year's best recordings".

Track listing

Personnel
 Robert "Kool" Bell - bass
 Ronald "Khalis" Bell - tenor saxophone, keyboards
 Claydes Charles Smith - guitar
 Gary Brown - vocals
 Sennie "Skip" Martin - vocals, trumpet, percussion (lead on 3–9, 11)
 Odeen Mays - vocals, keyboards (lead on 1, 2, 4, 7, 10)
 Larry Gittens - trumpet, vocals, keyboards
 Michael Ray - trumpet
 Clifford Adams - trombone, vocals
 George Brown - keyboards
 Robert "Robbie G" Goble - drums

Charts

References

Kool & the Gang albums
1989 albums
Mercury Records albums

Music-related lists